Petar Novák (born 24 August 1962) is a Czech former professional footballer who played as a striker.

Career
While playing for Sparta Prague, Novák was top scorer of the 1988 European Cup, scoring a total of four goals in the competition.

After retiring as a player, Novák qualified as a doctor, and has worked as the team physician for former club Sparta Prague.

References

1962 births
Living people
Czech footballers
AC Sparta Prague players
UEFA Champions League top scorers
Association football forwards